Henry Alexander Baldwin or Harry Alexander Baldwin (January 12, 1871 – October 8, 1946) was a sugarcane plantation manager, and politician who served as Congressional Delegate to the United States House of Representatives representing the Territory of Hawaii. He was one of the earliest leaders of the Hawaii Republican Party.

Life 
Alexander & Baldwin, one of the "Big Five" corporations that dominated Hawaii economics in the early twentieth century, was started by his father Henry Perrine Baldwin and uncle Samuel Thomas Alexander in 1869. His father was son of early missionary Dwight Baldwin, and his mother Emily Whitney Alexander was daughter of early missionary William P. Alexander. 
Born January 12, 1871 on the Baldwin house at the Paliuli sugar mill in the Kingdom of Hawaii on the island of Maui, between the towns of Pāia and Makawao, Hawaii. Baldwin was educated in Honolulu at Punahou School. His parents sent him to Phillips Academy in Andover, Massachusetts from which he graduated in 1889. In 1894, Baldwin obtained a degree at the Massachusetts Institute of Technology, where he was a member of the Chi Phi Fraternity.

He returned to work for his father and uncle on the Haiku sugarcane plantation. From 1897 to 1904 he became manager. Sugarcane production became very profitable with increasing trade with the United States and annexation of Hawaii in 1898. Haiku merged with the Pāia plantation, and he became president of the combined operation called the Maui Agricultural Company. 
He served as president of Maui Telephone Company, and Maui Publishing Company. He was a director of Baldwin Bank, which later became part of First Hawaiian Bank. In 1916, during World War I, he served as colonel of the 3rd Regiment of the Hawaii National Guard. On July 19, 1897 he married Ethel Frances Smith (1879–1967), daughter of lawyer William Owen Smith in Honolulu — his younger brother Samuel would later marry sister Katherine Smith. They had one daughter, Frances Hobron (1904–1996) who married J. Walter Cameron (1895–1976), manager of the Pineapple plantation in Honolua.
Cameron's company Maui Pineapple Company merged with Baldwin's pineapple business to become the Maui Land & Pineapple Company.  The Camerons' son Colin Cameron founded the Kapalua Bay Hotel & Villas resort.
The pineapple business continued until 2009.

Politics 
Baldwin became county chairman for the Hawaii Republican Party in 1912.
He entered local politics in 1913 when he was elected to the Hawaii Territorial Senate. He was territorial senator until 1921 when he was called to higher office to fulfill the unexpired term of Prince Jonah Kūhiō Kalanianaole in Washington, D.C. who had died. Baldwin was elected to fill the vacancy for Congressional Delegate from March 25, 1922 to March 3, 1923. Despite pleas to continue service, he retired from politics and returned to his private business ventures. Baldwin emerged from retirement to serve in the Hawaii Territorial House of Representatives in 1933. Following a single term, Baldwin returned to the upper chamber where he became territory senate president in 1937. He died at Pāia, Maui on October 8, 1946 and was buried in Makawao Cemetery.

Legacy
The 1917 mansion designed by his cousin architect Charles William Dickey called Kaluanui is now the home of Hui Noeau Visual Arts Center. It is located at 2841 Baldwin Avenue, Makawao, .

Family tree

See also
 Sugar plantations in Hawaii

References 

1871 births
1946 deaths
Members of the Hawaii Territorial Legislature
Delegates to the United States House of Representatives from the Territory of Hawaii
Republican Party members of the United States House of Representatives from Hawaii
20th-century American politicians
Hawaii Republicans
Businesspeople from Hawaii